Joan of England may refer to:

Joan of England, Queen of Sicily (1165–1199), daughter of Henry II of England; married William II of Sicily
Joan, Lady of Wales (1191–1237), illegitimate daughter of John, King of England; married Llywelyn the Great of Gwynedd
Joan of England, Queen Consort of Scotland (1210–1238), third child and eldest daughter of John, King of England and Isabella of Angoulême; married Alexander II of Scotland
Joan of England, Countess of Gloucester (1272–1307), known as Joan of Acre, daughter of Edward I of England
Joan of the Tower (1321–1362), second daughter and youngest child of Edward II of England and Isabella of France; married David II of Scotland
Joan of England (born 1333 or 1334; died 1348), youngest daughter of Edward III of England and Philippa of Hainault
Joan of Kent (born 1326 or 1327, died 1385), the "Fair Maid of Kent", mother of Richard II of England